Sun is the fourth solo studio album by Finnish musician Nopsajalka. Released on 14 March 2014, the album peaked at number 15 on the Finnish Albums Chart.

Track listing

Charts

Release history

References

2014 albums
Nopsajalka albums
Finnish-language albums